(born March 19, 1969 in Hokkaidō, Japan) is a Japanese horse trainer and former jockey. Nicknamed Ebi-Shō.

He is best known for riding El Condor Pasa. That won the Japan Cup (1998) and second in Prix de l'Arc de Triomphe (1999).

In 2010 he won the Japanese Fillies' Triple Crown with Apapane.

He retired as a jockey in February of 2021 after earning his license as a horse trainer. He inherited 33 horses from Kazuo Fujisawa in 2022, as he was retiring from horse training.

Major wins 
 France
 Grand Prix de Saint-Cloud - (1) - El Condor Pasa (1999)

 Hong Kong
 Hong Kong Cup - (1) - Fujiyama Kenzan (1995)

 Japan
 Arima Kinen - (2) - Manhattan Cafe (2001), Matsurida Gogh (2007)
 Asahi Hai Futurity Stakes - (2) - Dream Journey (2006), Danon Platina (2014)
 Hanshin Juvenile Fillies - (2) - Apapane (2009), Shonan Adela (2014)
 Japan Breeding farm's Cup Sprint - (1) - Nobo Jack (2001)
 Japan Cup - (1) - El Condor Pasa (1998)
 Kikuka Shō - (1) - Manhattan Cafe (2001)
 Mile Championship - (2) - Air Jihad (1999), Tokai Point (2002)
 Oka Sho - (1) - Apapane (2010)
 Queen Elizabeth II Commemorative Cup - (1) - Marialite (2015)
 Satsuki Sho - (2) - Isla Bonita (2014), Dee Majesty (2016)
 Shuka Sho - (1) - Apapane (2010)
 Sprinters Stakes - (1) - Trot Star (2001)
 Takamatsunomiya Kinen - (1) - Trot Star (2001)
 Takarazuka Kinen - (1) - Marialite (2016)
 Teio sho - (1) - Fast Friend (2000)
 Tenno Sho (Autumn) - (1) - Bubble Gum Fellow (1996)
 Tenno Sho (Spring) -(3) - Manhattan Cafe (2002), Fenomeno (2013 & 2014)
 Tokyo Daishoten - (1) - Fast Friend (2000)
 Victoria Mile - (1) - Apapane (2011)
 Yasuda Kinen - (1) - Air Jihad (1999)
 Yushun Himba - (2) - Umeno Fiber (1999), Apapane (2010)

References

External links
 Masayoshi-Ebina.com (fan site)
 
 

Living people
1969 births
Japanese jockeys
Japanese horse trainers
Sportspeople from Sapporo